Chennaiyil Thiruvaiyaru is an iconic music festival, which has been conducted consecutively since 2005. It is an eight-day Carnatic music festival lasting from 18 to 25 December every year at Kamarajar Arangam, Teynampet, Chennai. Performances by leading Carnatic and Hindustani stalwarts, legends, upcoming talents, musicians, dancers, and discourses have been scheduled elaborately in this weeklong event with more than 50 enchanting shows commencing from 7:00 am to 10:00 pm daily.

History
Carnatic musicians and Rasikas of classical music, Thiruvaiyaru is also the place to go beyond the limitation of language, religion, caste, creed, and nationality and understand their true self through music. In 2005, Lakshman Sruthi promoted a platform for Indian Classical Music festival in Chennai in the name of Chennaiyil Thiruvaiyaru this festival provides a forum for established artists as well as new talent to exhibit their musical skills.

Festival
More than 500+ artists participated in this festival every year, and its held for about 8 days. Leading exponents of Carnatic music come to perform and to pay their homage to the Great Composer Sri Tyagaraja and watched by thousands of ardent fans of classical music.

This prestigious program has been inaugurated every year by eminent personalities like ‘Bharat Ratna’ Dr. A.P.J.Abdul Kalam, Padma Bhushan Kamal Haasan. Elaborate arrangements have been made to accommodate some 500+ artists to take part and render the eternal Pancharatna Kriti in unison. For this particular program, the stage arrangement will be a replica of the Thyagaraja Aradhana Mandapam at Thiruvaiyaru. Printed copies of the kritis will be distributed to members of the audience, who can join the singing.

Lakshman Sruthi - The musical consortium in Chennai, is conducting this event.

Food festival
A food festival is also being organized, along with the musical fest, within the same premises. The food fest comprises innovative, concept-oriented food stalls, exotic cuisine, competitions, vegetable carving, ice carving, organic and bio food stalls and cookery exhibits by leading chefs.

Recognition and contributions
 Isaiyazhwar: Chennaiyil Thiruvaiyaru, since 2014 has been recognising and rewarding people who contributed to the field of Carnatic music by honouring them with the title "Isaiyazhwar" In 2014, Thiruvizha Jayashankar was the first person to receive the Isaiyazhwar award from Chennaiyil Thiruvaiyaru.
 In 2015, violin maestro Padma Shree A. Kanyakumari was honoured Isaiyazhwar title by P. Susheela along with the gold medal for her lifetime achievement and contribution to classical music.

Awards
 Incredible India – Best tourism event of the year 2015 award was presented by P. Susheela to Chennaiyil Thiruvaiyaru organisation.

See also

 list of Indian classical music festivals

References
 Article title
 
 http://www.chennaidecemberseason.com/2011/11/chennaiyil-thiruvaiyaru.html
 http://kalakkalcinema.com/mahathi-at-chennaiyil-thiruvaiyaru-season-11-press-meet/ 
 http://sethasethach.skyrock.com/tags/76mKrwSObNF-chennaiyil-thiruvaiyaru-2012.html
 
  
 http://flickstatus.com/tamil/chennaiyil-thiruvaiyaru-season-11-day-7-stills.html
 http://indiapulse.sulekha.com/carnatic-music/chennaiyil-thiruvaiyaru-season-9-carnatic-fest-1_post_5193
 http://yellowpages.sulekha.com/articles/chennaiyil-thiruvaiyaru.htm 
 http://www.arunasairam.org/past-concerts-details.asp?cid=98 
 https://web.archive.org/web/20140201093911/http://www.studioflicks.com/gallery/9th-chennaiyil-thiruvaiyaru-inauguration-stills/
 http://www.nettv4u.com/events-gallery/tamil/chennaiyil-thiruvaiyaru-season-11-press-meet-stills
 http://tamilnadu.indiaeveryday.in/news-chennaiyil-thiruvaiyaru-season-11-press-meet-stills-1201-1460889.htm
 http://www.kollywoodtoday.net/news/chennaiyil-thiruvaiyaru-press-release/ 
 http://www.kollyinsider.com/2011/12/chennaiyil-thiruvaiyaru-season-7.html 
 http://www.artindia.net/madras12/3.html 
 http://cinemafry.blogspot.in/2012/12/meenakshi-raghavan-bharatanatyam-at.html 
  
 http://indiainteracts.in/gossip/2011/01/03/17963/TVH-Chennaiyil-Thiruvaiyaru-goes-on-Air-on-Vijay-TV/ 
 http://www.kollystar.com/videos/chennaiyil-thiruvaiyaru-pressmeet-video-9136.html 
 http://www.tamilnow.com/movies/misc/chennaiyil-thiruvaiyaru-food-festival-inauguration 
 http://juttlog.com/d-x3j0t1g.html

External links
 Article title 
 
 http://www.chennaidecemberseason.com/2011/11/chennaiyil-thiruvaiyaru.html
 http://www.indian-heritage.org/musicseason/sch.html
 http://www.eventjini.com/chennaiyilthiruvaiyaru
 http://screen4tv.com/zee-tamil-to-telecast-chennaiyil-thiruvaiyaru-season-11/
 Article title

 

Carnatic classical music festivals
Culture of Chennai
Music festivals in India
Tamil festivals
Events in Chennai